The Mastercard International Global Headquarters is an office building located at 2000 Purchase Street in the hamlet of Purchase, New York. It was constructed in the early 1980s as part of a movement of large corporations onto suburban estate settings, and has been called the "architectural jewel of Westchester". The building is part of the Purchase Centre complex and originally was constructed by the Nestlé company and occupied by IBM for several years. It was designed by I. M. Pei of Pei Cobb Freed & Partners and has won awards over the years for its architectural style.

Structure

The facility is a three-story building that incorporates travertine stone and architectural concrete to maximize the effectiveness of natural resources.  The facility is composed of a central lobby with a full-height atrium and two quarter-circle wings to the north and west with smaller atria, all incorporating natural features such as ficus trees and an indoor stream.  Also on-site is a cafeteria, a company store, and other employee amenities.  A 1,100 car parking facility is built into a hillside on the site.

Awards
1988 Building Stone Institute: Annual Tucker Award
1986 American Institute of Architects: National Honor Award
1986 Concrete Industry Board: Annual Award

References

Financial services company headquarters in the United States
Buildings and structures in Westchester County, New York
Harrison, New York
Office buildings completed in 1984
1984 establishments in New York (state)
Office buildings in New York (state)
Mastercard